The Federal Service for Supervision of Natural Resources (Rosprirodnadzor; Russian: Федеральная служба по надзору в сфере природопользования (Росприроднадзор), tr. Federal'naya sluzhba po nadzoru v sfere prirodopolzovaniya) is the Federal Environmental, Industrial and Nuclear Supervision Service of Russia. This regulator is part of the Ministry of Natural Resources of the Russian Federation.

History
In August 2019, the Minister of Natural Resources of the Russian Federation decreed that Rosprirodnadzor would be shrunk from 89 regional entities into 32 super-regional entities.

In September 2019, Rosprirodnadzor and Norilsk Nickel signed an agreement whereby the latter would "automatically meter and monitor pollutant emissions" from "its mining facilities".

On 4 June 2020, Rosprirodnadzor declared a state of emergency when 20,000 tonnes of diesel oil had spilled since 29 May from a plant owned by power subsidiary NTEK of Norilsk Nickel. The Investigative Committee of Russia opened a criminal case "over the pollution and alleged negligence", and the plant supervisor was taken into custody.

In July 2020, Rosprirodnadzor sought compensation of $2 billion for the diesel spill. Minister of Natural Resources Dmitry Kobylkin reminded everyone that the polluter-pay principle strengthens his jurisdiction.

Leadership
 Oleg Mitvol (2004-2009)
 Svetlana Radionova (2019)

References

External links
 Official website of the Federal Service for Supervision of Natural Resources  

Government of Russia
Environment
Russia
Organizations based in Moscow
Environment of Russia